The Vanishing (literally: "Traceless" or "Without a Trace") is a 1988 Dutch thriller film directed by George Sluizer, adapted from the novella The Golden Egg (1984) by Tim Krabbé. It stars Gene Bervoets as a man who searches obsessively for his girlfriend following her disappearance at a rest area.

The Vanishing was released on 27 October 1988, and received positive reviews. Sluizer remade the film in English in 1993; the remake was poorly received.

Plot
A young Dutch couple, Rex and Saskia, are on holiday in France. As they drive, Saskia shares a recurring dream in which she is drifting through space in a golden egg. In the most recent dream, another egg containing another person appeared; she feels the collision of the two eggs would signify the end of something.

Their car runs out of petrol and they stop at a rest area, where a man in another car dons a false sling and orthopedic cast. Rex promises to never abandon Saskia and they bury two coins at the base of a tree as a symbol of their romance. Saskia enters the petrol station to buy drinks and does not return. Rex frantically searches for her.

Some time earlier, Raymond, a wealthy family man, secretly plots to abduct a woman. He buys an isolated house, experiments with chloroform, and rehearses methods of enticing women into his car. When his initial attempts at abduction fail, he poses as an injured motorist in need of assistance and goes to the rest area out of town, where he will not be recognised.

Three years after Saskia's disappearance, Rex is still searching for her. He has received several postcards inviting him to meet the kidnapper at a cafe in Nîmes, but the kidnapper never comes. Unknown to Rex, the cafe is directly opposite Raymond's apartment, where he watches Rex wait. Rex's new girlfriend, Lieneke, reluctantly helps him search for Saskia. One day, Rex has a dream similar to Saskia's in which he is trapped in a golden egg. Unable to endure his obsession, Lieneke leaves him.

Rex makes a public appeal on television, saying he only wants to know the truth about what happened to Saskia. Raymond confronts Rex and admits to the kidnapping; he says he will reveal what happened to her if Rex comes with him. As they drive, Raymond says he has known from a young age that he has no conscience, and is therefore capable of anything. After saving a young girl from drowning, he resolved to commit the worst crime he could imagine in order to test if he was worthy of his daughter's admiration; in his view, one can only be a truly good person if one is capable of doing something evil, but chooses not to do it. He describes how he kidnapped Saskia at the rest stop by posing as a traveling salesman and enticing her into his car.

Raymond takes Rex to the rest area. He dismisses Rex's threats of police action, saying there is no evidence connecting him to the crime. Pouring a cup of drugged coffee, Raymond tells Rex the only way to learn what happened to Saskia is to experience it himself. As Raymond waits in the car, Rex rages, unsure of what to do. After digging up the coins he and Saskia buried years earlier, he drinks the coffee and awakens buried in a box underground.

On a sunny day, Raymond relaxes at his country home, surrounded by his wife and children. A newspaper sitting in his car features a headline about the double disappearance of Saskia and Rex.

Cast
Bernard-Pierre Donnadieu as Raymond Lemorne (his surname means 'the gloomy one'), a French chemistry professor, who in his teens realized he was a sociopath. To prove to himself that he is capable of "the ultimate evil", he decides to kidnap and murder a young woman.
Gene Bervoets as Rex Hofman, a Dutch traveler on a holiday with his girlfriend Saskia Wagter in France. Three years after Saskia vanishes at a service station, Rex is still searching for her, obsessed with finding out what happened to her.
Johanna ter Steege as Saskia Wagter, Rex's Dutch girlfriend who travels with him through France until she goes missing at a service station.
Gwen Eckhaus as Lieneke, whom Rex is dating three years after Saskia's disappearance.
Bernadette Le Saché as Simone Lemorne, Raymond's wife. Like the rest of her family, she is completely unaware of Raymond's crime.
Tania Latarjet as Denise Lemorne, the elder daughter of Simone and Raymond.
Lucille Glenn as Gabrielle Lemorne, the younger daughter of Simone and Raymond.

Production

Writing
Before working on The Vanishing, Sluizer became familiar with journalist Tim Krabbé through his articles about filmmaking in the United States. These articles eventually became a novel, which Sluizer adapted into his film Red Desert Penitentiary (1985). After Red Desert Penitentiary, Krabbé began writing a novel called Het Gouden Ei ( The Golden Egg). As the film was set in France, Krabbé asked Sluizer about names of towns, and Sluizer advised him on town names as well as family names. Sluizer had access to the early manuscripts of the novel, and after reading the first few chapters he stated that he wanted to buy the film rights.

Krabbé initially offered to write the script for Sluizer after he had finished the book. Sluizer described the script's first draft as "not bad, but not good" and wrote the second draft with Krabbé. The two worked on a third draft together, and Sluizer stated they began to have what he described as a "difference of opinion" over what should happen in the film, the placing of scenes, and how to dramatically tell the story. Sluizer stopped working with Krabbé, stating that he had bought the film rights and he would finish the script himself, which angered Krabbé. The completed film accurately portrays the narrative within the novel, apart from two factors: first, the film's narrative is more complicated than that of the novel, making extensive use of flashbacks and gradually revealing personality traits of the central characters; and, second, Rex and Raymond spend more time together following their meeting in the film than they do in the novel.

Casting
A casting agent suggested Sluizer see Johanna ter Steege, who was in a student play, for the role of Saskia Wagter. When Sluizer saw that Steege's hair was a similar color to his daughter's, he decided she would be right for the character.

For the role of Rex, there was a choice between two actors: a Dutch actor and Belgian actor Gene Bervoets. Sluizer chose Bervoets because his French was stronger, but later felt unsure he had chosen the right actor, which led him to have a slightly uncomfortable relationship with Bervoets on set.

Jean-Louis Trintignant was Sluizer's initial choice for the role of Raymond Lemorne, but he was unavailable. After thinking about other French actors who could play the part, Sluizer thought of Bernard-Pierre Donnadieu, who had a small role in his film Twice a Woman (1979). Sluizer discovered Donnadieu had worked in television and had leading roles in films since appearing in Twice a Woman and got him signed to play Raymond.

Release

The Vanishing was released in the Netherlands on 27 October 1988. It was the Dutch submission for the Academy Award for Best Foreign Language Film in 1988, but was disqualified because the Academy determined there was too much French dialogue for it to represent the Netherlands. The Dutch declined to send another film, leaving them unrepresented among the foreign submissions for the first time since 1972.

Producers George Sluizer and Anne Lordon received the Golden Calf for Best Feature Film at the Netherlands Film Festival in 1988. Johanna ter Steege won a European Film Award for Best Supporting Actress in 1988.

The film was released in France on 20 December 1989 under the title L'Homme Qui Voulait Savoir.

Home media
The first North American copies of The Vanishing were released on Laserdisc by Image Entertainment on 3 November 1997. It was later released on VHS by Fox Lorber on 11 November 1997, followed by a DVD release on 13 May 1998.

The Criterion Collection released a DVD of the film on 18 September 2001.  This release contains the original French trailer and an essay on the film by film critic Kim Newman as supplemental material. Criterion released the film on Blu-ray and DVD on 28 October 2014, this time with the original French trailer, interviews with Sluizer and Johanna ter Steege, and an essay by Scott Foundas as supplements.

Under the supervision of EYE Film Institute Netherlands, the film was restored. This version was released on DVD as part of the George Sluizer “Collected Works” in 2019
 and online in 2021.

Radio play
In 2010, the film was adapted for radio by Oliver Emanuel and broadcast on BBC Radio 4 as part of the station's Saturday Drama slot. Directed by Kirsty Williams, it starred Samuel West, Melody Grove and Ruth Gemmell in the lead roles. It has since been repeated on BBC Radio 4 Extra.

Reception
The Vanishing received international praise at the time of its release. It was released in the United States in 1991 and made the National Board of Review's list of the Top Foreign Films of 1991. Desson Howe of The Washington Post praised the film's avoidance of cliches, noting that it is "refreshingly free of manipulative scenes involving running bath water, jagged-edge cutlery and bunnies in the saucepan". Howe also made note of the unusual move of revealing the kidnapper immediately and spending significant time learning about him. Roger Ebert wrote a similar approval of this in the Chicago Sun Times, stating, "One of the most intriguing things about The Vanishing is the film's unusual structure, which builds suspense even while it seems to be telling us almost everything we want to know." Stanley Kubrick thought The Vanishing was the most terrifying film he had seen – even more frightening than his own The Shining – and called Sluizer to discuss editing.  "Cadd." of Variety declared the film to be "the ultimate tribute to Alfred Hitchcock, daring to offer up an ending that goes beyond even the master's memorable climaxes."

Of the negative remarks, Dave Kehr, writing in the Chicago Tribune, said "It's a film that functions on curiosity rather than real interest ... yet in the end punishes the audience for wanting to have its questions answered."

The Vanishing holds a very high critical rating at the film review database Rotten Tomatoes, with a 98% approval rating based on 46 reviews, with an average rating of 8.4/10.  The site's critics consensus reads, "A clinical, maddening descent into the mind of a serial killer and a slowly unraveling hero, culminating with one of the scariest endings of all time." Empire magazine placed the film at number 67 in their list of "The 100 Best Films Of World Cinema" in 2010.
Time Out London placed it at 57 on its Top 100 Horror Films list.

See also

Dutch films of the 1980s
List of thriller films of the 1980s
The Vanishing (1993 film)
List of submissions to the 61st Academy Awards for Best Foreign Language Film
List of Dutch submissions for the Academy Award for Best Foreign Language Film

References

Sources

External links
 
 
 
The Vanishing: The End of the Road an essay by Scott Foundas at the Criterion Collection

1988 films
1988 thriller films
1980s psychological thriller films
Dutch thriller films
French thriller films
1980s Dutch-language films
1980s French-language films
Films based on Dutch novels
Films about kidnapping
Films about missing people
Films directed by George Sluizer
Films adapted into plays
1988 multilingual films
Dutch multilingual films
French multilingual films
1980s French films